Wayne Allen Reittie (born 21 January 1988) is a Jamaica international rugby league footballer who plays as a er for Hunslet in the RFL League 1.

He has previously played for Doncaster in 2008 National League Two and the 2009 RFL Championship, and the Hunslet Hawks and the York City Knights in Championship 1. Reittie has also played for the Batley Bulldogs and Halifax in the Championship.

Background
Reittie was born in London, England. He grew up in Belle Isle, Leeds, and played junior rugby with Hunslet Parkside.

Playing career
Reittie played for York City Knights in Championship 1 having started out as a professional with Doncaster.

He played for Hunslet in the latter half of 2009 following financial difficulties at Co-operative Championship club Doncaster. York City Knights had expressed an interest in the Leeds brought up winger, but he opted for their Championship One rivals Hunslet.

He is a Jamaican international.

He was born in London and brought up in Leeds. He played for Hunslet Parkside as a junior, the same club as dual-code international Jason Robinson.

Reittie is a product of the Leeds Academy.

In December 2015, Rettie represented Jamaica in the 2017 Rugby League World Cup qualifiers.

Hunslet
On 15 October 2021, it was reported that he had signed for Hunslet in the RFL League 1.

References

External links
Batley Bulldogs profile
York City Knights profile
Last tackle profile
USA THRILLS HOME CROWD IN DOWNING JAMAICA

1988 births
Living people
Batley Bulldogs players
Doncaster R.L.F.C. players
English people of Jamaican descent
Jamaican rugby league players
English rugby league players
Halifax R.L.F.C. players
Hunslet R.L.F.C. players
Jamaica national rugby league team captains
Jamaica national rugby league team players
Rugby league wingers
Rugby league players from London
York City Knights players